Mikael Antonsson (born 31 May 1981) is a Swedish former professional footballer who played as a defender. He currently works for the Danish Superliga side F.C. Copenhagen as assistant manager. As a player, he played professionally in Sweden, Austria, Greece, Italy, and Denmark during a career that spanned between 1996 and 2018. A full international between 2004 and 2015, he won 28 caps for the Sweden national team and was a part of their UEFA Euro 2012 squad.

Club career 
Antonsson was born in Karlskrona. He began his career in a local Swedish team called Sillhövda AIK (1996) and after two years he was transferred to Swedish champions IFK Göteborg. He played there until 2004, when Austria Wien bought him for €450,000. In January 2006 Panathinaikos FC brought him in Athens to play for them on a 2-year contract. In the summer 2007 he moved to the Danish champions F.C. Copenhagen.

Mikael Antonsson started the season 2010–11 impressively with new teammate, Sölvi Ottesen, which reminded fans of former steady partnership between Michael Gravgaard and Brede Hangeland. In the 2–0 win against former club and Greek champions Panathinaikos FC, Antonsson chosen for the  Goal.com Champions League "Team of the Round".

In 2011, Antonsson moved to Bologna in the Italian Serie A on a free transfer before wrapping up his career in Copenhagen between 2014 and his retirement in 2018.

International career 
Antonsson won 28 caps between 2004 and 2015 and represented Sweden at UEFA Euro 2012.

Career statistics

International

Honours
Austria Wien
Austrian Bundesliga: 2005–06
Austrian Cup: 2004–05, 2005–06
Copenhagen

Danish Superliga: 2008–09, 2009–10, 2010–11, 2015–16, 2016–17
Danish Cup: 2008–09, 2014–15, 2015–16, 2016–17

References

External links
F.C. Copenhagen profile 

National team profile

1981 births
Living people
Swedish footballers
Sweden international footballers
Sweden youth international footballers
Sweden under-21 international footballers
IFK Göteborg players
Panathinaikos F.C. players
F.C. Copenhagen players
FK Austria Wien players
Bologna F.C. 1909 players
Allsvenskan players
Danish Superliga players
Austrian Football Bundesliga players
Super League Greece players
Serie A players
Swedish expatriate footballers
Expatriate footballers in Austria
Expatriate footballers in Greece
Expatriate men's footballers in Denmark
Expatriate footballers in Italy
Swedish expatriate sportspeople in Austria
Swedish expatriate sportspeople in Denmark
Swedish expatriate sportspeople in Greece
Swedish expatriate sportspeople in Italy
Association football central defenders
UEFA Euro 2012 players
People from Karlskrona
Sportspeople from Blekinge County